Alpine skiing at the 2017 Winter Universiade was held at the Shymbulak near Almaty, the largest city of Kazakhstan from January 29 to February 7, 2017.

Men's events

Women's events

Mixed Event

References

External links
Results book

 
Alpine skiing
Winter Universiade
2017